The 5th Season is Taiwanese Mandopop artist Angela Chang's sixth Mandarin studio album. It was released by Linfair Records on 25 September 2009.

The title track "白白的" (White) is listed at number 66 on Hit Fm Taiwan's Hit Fm Annual Top 100 Singles Chart (Hit-Fm年度百首單曲) for 2009.

Track listing

References

External links
  Angela Chang discography@Linfair Records

2009 albums
Angela Chang albums